Final del juego (End of the Game) is a book of eighteen short stories written by Julio Cortázar.

Stories

I
 Continuidad de los Parques ("Continuity of Parks")
 No se culpe a nadie ("Don't You Blame Anyone")
 El Río ("The River")
 Los Venenos ("Poisons")
 La Puerta Condenada ("The Doomed Door")
 Las Ménades ("The Maenades")

II
 El Ídolo de las Cícladas ("The Idol of the Cyclades")
 Una Flor Amarilla ("A Yellow Flower")
 Sobremesa ("After-Dinner Conversation")
 La Banda ("The Edge")
 Los Amigos ("The Friends")
 El Móvil ("The Mobile")
 Torito ("Little Bull")

III
 Relato con un Fondo de Agua ("Report with a Water Backdrop")
 Después del Almuerzo ("In the Afternoon")
 Axolotl ("Axolotl")
 La Noche Boca Arriba ("The Night Face Up")
 Final del Juego ("End of the Game")

References
Peter Standish, Understanding Julio Cortázar
Artículo de Santiago Juan-Navarro sobre “Continuidad de los parques”

1956 short story collections
Short story collections by Julio Cortázar
Postmodern books